James Alfred Busby (November 28, 1900 – October 2, 1960) was an American Negro league third baseman in the 1930s.

A native of Benton Harbor, Michigan, Busby was the brother of fellow Negro leaguer Maurice Busby. He played for the Detroit Stars in 1933. Busby died in 1960 at age 59.

References

External links
 and Seamheads

1900 births
1960 deaths
Place of death missing
Indianapolis ABCs (1931–1933) players
20th-century African-American sportspeople